Allium nevii, known by the common name Nevius' onion or Nevius' garlic, is a plant species native to central Washington (Klickitat, Yakima, Kittitas and Chelan Counties) and north-central Oregon (Wasco and Hood River Counties) in the United States. It grows in wet meadows and along stream banks at elevations up to 2000 m.

Description 
Allium nevii produces egg-shaped bulbs up to 2 cm across. One plant will generally have 1-3 scapes, each round or slightly flattened and up to 25 cm tall. Flowers are in umbels of as many as 30 flowers, each bell-shaped and about 7 mm across. Tepals are rose-colored; anthers and pollen blue.

Taxonomy 
Historically, Allium nevii was treated as part of the Allium douglasii alliance. Both A. douglasii and A. nevii were placed in the Ownbey Allium falcifolium alliance and subsequently by Traub in subsection Falcifolia, section Lophioprason, subgenus Amerallium (see Taxonomy of Allium).

References

Bibliography 

 
 
 
 

nevii
Flora of Washington (state)
Flora of Oregon
Endemic flora of the United States
Onions
Plants described in 1879
Taxa named by Sereno Watson